The Oberheim Prommer is a monophonic sampler capable of programming EPROM chips for use in Oberheim DMX, Linn, Simmons, and Sequential drum machines, allowing you use you own samples in these devices. The device can be triggered by MIDI, or via Oberheim's pre-MIDI parallel bus.

Features
The Prommer uses the 8 bit COMDAC format and features 64k of RAM. the maximum sampling rate is 32 kHz.

Editing of samples
 Attack
 Decay
 Reverse
 Ring modulation
 Stretch/squash

Notable users

References

External links

Prommer